Synopsia may refer to:

 Synopsia (moth), a moth genus
 Synesthesia, a perceptual phenomenon

See also
 Synopsis (disambiguation)